National Lampoon's European Vacation is a 1985 American comedy film directed by Amy Heckerling and written by John Hughes and Robert Klane. The second film in National Lampoon's Vacation film series, it stars Chevy Chase, Beverly D'Angelo, Dana Hill, Jason Lively, Victor Lanoux, and Eric Idle with special appearances by John Astin, Paul Bartel, Maureen Lipman, Willy Millowitsch, Mel Smith, and Moon Zappa. It tells the story of the Griswold family when they win an all-expense-paid trip to Europe as chaos of all sorts occur.

The film received mixed reviews from critics.

Plot
The Griswold family competes in a game show called Pig in a Poke and wins an all-expenses-paid trip to Europe. In a whirlwind tour of Western Europe, chaos of all sorts ensues.

They stay in a fleabag London hotel with a sloppy, tattooed Cockney desk clerk. While in their English rental car, a yellow Austin Maxi, Clark's tendency to drive on the wrong side of the road causes frequent accidents, including knocking over a bicyclist they have many run-ins with. Later, Clark drives the family around the busy Lambeth Bridge roundabout for hours, unable to maneuver his way out of the chaotic traffic. At Stonehenge, Clark accidentally backs the car into an ancient stone monolith, toppling all the stones like dominoes, which they do not even notice as they happily leave the scene.

In Paris, the family wears stenciled berets, causing Rusty to be teased by young women at the Eiffel Tower observation deck. Clark offers to get rid of the beret for Rusty, but when he throws it away, another visitor's dachshund mistakes it for a Frisbee and jumps off the tower after it, landing safely in a nearby pond. The family's video camera is stolen by a passerby whom Clark had asked to take a picture of the family. Clark is also mocked by a French waiter for his terrible French, though he does not realize it. Later, Clark and Ellen visit a bawdy Paris can-can dance show, finding Rusty already there with a prostitute.

Next in a West German village, the Griswolds burst in on a bewildered elderly couple, who they mistakenly think are relatives but the couple ends up providing them dinner and lodging anyway, each family not being able to understand the other's language. Clark turns a lively Bavarian folk dance stage performance into an all-out street brawl, after which, while fleeing, he hastily knocks down several street vendors' stands and gets their Citroën DS stuck in a narrow medieval archway.

In Rome, the Griswolds rent a car at a travel office, but unknown to them, the men in charge are thieves, holding the real manager captive. The lead thief gives them a car with the manager in the trunk, claiming he lost the trunk keys. The next day, Ellen is shocked to discover that private, sexy videos of her from the family's stolen video camera have been used in a billboard advertising porn, leaving her completely humiliated. After screaming angrily at Clark (who had told her he had erased the video), Ellen storms off to their hotel where she encounters the thief who rented them the car. She confesses her recent troubles, still unaware that he is a criminal. The man then tries to get the car keys, which are in her purse, but fails. When the police arrive at the hotel, he kidnaps Ellen, prompting Clark to rescue her.

On the flight home, Clark falls into the pilot's cockpit and accidentally causes the plane to knock the Statue of Liberty's torch upside down as Russell says "The Griswolds are back".

Cast

The Griswolds:
 Chevy Chase as Clark Griswold, the patriarch of the Griswald family
 Beverly D'Angelo as Ellen Griswold, the wife of Clark
 Dana Hill as Audrey Griswold, the daughter of Clark and Ellen; She was portrayed by Dana Barron in the previous film
 Jason Lively as Russell "Rusty" Griswold, the son of Clark and Ellen; He was portrayed by Anthony Michael Hall in the previous film

Characters in America:
 John Astin as Kent Winkdale, the host of Pig in a Poke
 Paul Bartel as Mr. Froeger, the patriarch of the Froeger family that competed against the Griswalds on Pig in a Poke
 Cynthia Szigeti as Mrs. Froeger, the wife of Mr. Froeger
 Malcolm Danare as Moe Froeger, the son of Mr. and Mrs. Froeger
 Kevi Kendall as Ruth Froeger, the daughter of Mr. and Mrs. Froeger
 William Zabka as Jack, Audrey's boyfriend
 Sheila Kennedy as the Game Show Hostess #1.
 Gary Owens as the voice of Johnny (uncredited), the announcer of Pig in a Poke

Characters in England:
 Jeannette Charles as Queen Elizabeth II, the Queen of The United Kingdom who appears in Ellen's dream sequence.
 Peter Hugo as Prince Charles, the son of Queen Elizabeth II who appears in Ellen's dream sequence.
 Julie Wooldridge as Princess Diana, the wife of Prince Charles who appears in Ellen's dream sequence.
 Mel Smith as a London hotel manager
 Robbie Coltrane as a man in the bathroom
 Maureen Lipman as a lady in the bed
 Paul McDowell as First English motorist
 Ballard Berkeley as Second English motorist
 Eric Idle as The Bike Rider, an unnamed bike rider with whom the Griswalds have several accidental encounters all over Europe
 Derek Deadman as Taxi Driver

Characters in France:
 Jacques Herlin as a French hotel desk clerk
 Sylvie Badalati as Rusty's French girl

Characters in Germany:
 Willy Millowitsch as Fritz Spritz, the supposed relative of Clark
 Erika Wackernagel as Helga Spritz, the wife of Fritz and a supposed relative of Clark
 Claudia Neidig as Claudia, Rusty's German girl

Characters in Italy:
 Victor Lanoux as The Thief, an unnamed criminal who took over a travel office
 Massimo Sarchielli as The Other Thief, the unnamed accomplice of the unnamed thief
 Moon Unit Zappa as Rusty's California girl

Production
John Hughes received nominal credit for writing and story, due to the use of characters and ideas from the first Vacation film, but was not directly involved with European Vacation. Hughes would later state that Warner Bros had begged him for a sequel to Vacation but he declined at the time. He would eventually agree to return to the franchise by adapting one of his other National Lampoon stories, "Christmas '59," into National Lampoon's Christmas Vacation in 1989.

Casting
Producer Matty Simmons initially told Dana Barron she would be returning to the role of Audrey. But after Anthony Michael Hall declined to reprise his role and was opting to star in Weird Science, Heckerling requested both children be recast.

Locations
Famous landmarks and sights appearing as the family tours England, France, West Germany, and Italy include:
 London's Tower Bridge
 Lambeth Bridge Roundabout (Clark drives the car into the inner ring and can't get out of the traffic)
 Buckingham Palace
 Heathrow Airport, Hounslow, Middlesex
 Big Ben (Clark repeatedly announces to the kids on every loop around the Lambeth Bridge roundabout)
 Palace of Westminster
 Stonehenge (a scale model of the monument was constructed and Wiltshire was not visited by the crew)
 Paris's Left Bank
 Fontaine des Innocents
 Eiffel Tower
 Louvre museum
 Notre Dame de Paris cathedral
 Rome's Colosseum
 Spanish Steps
 Piazza Navona

Other locations used in the film include:
 Statue of Liberty (the torch of which their plane crashes into and knocks over)
 Notting Hill, West London (Clark runs over Eric Idle's character here)

Scenes supposedly taking place in West Germany were actually shot in a German-speaking part of Italy (Brixen).

Music
The musical score for National Lampoon's European Vacation was composed by Charles Fox, who replaced Ralph Burns of the first film. Lindsey Buckingham's "Holiday Road" was once again featured as the film's theme song, with many other contemporary songs included throughout the film.

 "Holiday Road" by Lindsey Buckingham
 "Some Like It Hot" by Power Station
 "Town Called Malice" by The Jam
 "Problèmes d'amour" by Alexander Robotnick
 "Ça plane pour moi" by Plastic Bertrand
 "Pig In a Poke" by Danny Gould
 "Baby It's You, Yes I Am" by Danger Zone
 "New Looks" by Dr. John
 "Back in America" by Network

Reception

Box office
National Lampoon's European Vacation opened July 26, 1985 in 1,546 North American theaters and grossed $12,329,627 its opening weekend, ranking number one at the box office. After its initial run, the film grossed a total of $49,364,621 domestically.

Critical response
Review aggregation website Rotten Tomatoes gives National Lampoon's European Vacation a score of 34% based on reviews from 29 critics, with an average of 5 out of 10. The critical consensus reads; "European Vacation charts a course through a succession of pretty destinations, but the journey itself lacks the laughs that made the original outing so memorable." On Metacritic, it has a score of 47 out of 100 based on 10 critics, indicating "mixed or average reviews".

Janet Maslin of The New York Times thought positively of the film stating, "While it's very much a retread, it succeeds in following up the first film's humor with more in a similar vein." She added, "The film's best visual humor arises from the mere juxtaposition of European settings with the funny hats, T-shirts and soda cans with which the Griswalds announce their presence." Entertainment magazine Variety gave the film a negative review explaining, "As the family of characters cartwheel through London, Paris, Italy and Germany - with the French deliciously taking it on the chin for their arrogance and rudeness - director Amy Heckerling gets carried away with physical humor while letting her American tourists grow tiresome and predictable. Structurally, the film unfolds like a series of travel brochures."

References

External links

 
 

1985 films
1980s adventure comedy films
American adventure comedy films
American sequel films
1980s English-language films
Films about vacationing
Films directed by Amy Heckerling
Films scored by Charles Fox
Films set in Chicago
Films set in London
Films set in England
Films set in Paris
Films set in West Germany
Films set in Rome
Films shot in London
Films shot in England
Films shot in Paris
Films shot in Rome
Films shot in Italy
National Lampoon's Vacation (film series)
Films about quizzes and game shows
Films with screenplays by John Hughes (filmmaker)
Warner Bros. films
Brooksfilms films
1985 comedy films
1980s American films